HEXBUG is a brand of infrared and automaton toys developed and distributed by Innovation First International. HEXBUG uses many elements used in BEAM robotics. First piloted in the US through RadioShack, HEXBUG is now sold in most major retail stores.  The original Hexbugs are based on six-legged arthropods but now come in several different varieties. The name "HEXBUG" relates to the six-sided packaging it is sold in, rather than to its number of legs.

History 
HEXBUG was founded in 2007 in Greenville, Texas, by Innovation First International, Inc., a company that was founded in 1996 developing small-scale robotic products, mostly for FIRST Robotics Competition. HEXBUG was designed to expand the company's presence in the retail toy market, as well as add to the experience created by VEX Robotics, a subsidiary brand of Innovation First International, Inc. that specializes in robotics built in a fashion similar to Erector Sets, and Rack Solutions, which is an engineering firm that specializes in information technology products.

Some products of HEXBUG have been sold abroad, such as in Japan by toymaker Bandai. The packaging in these international versions differs slightly, as the HEXBUG logo is blue instead of its signature orange and grey appearance, but the products still retain their signature hexagonal packaging.

Various product lines have been sold under the HEXBUG name, such as the nano, BattleBots, Micro Titans, HEXMODS, JunkBots, and MoBots series. Additionally, separate products, such as cat toys and board games have been released.

Products

Original 
The Original HEXBUG model is a toy that reacts to loud sounds and pressure on its antennae and scurries around the room. Designed after a beetle, it was available in five different shapes and colors: Alpha (orange), Bravo (green), Charlie (blue), Delta (yellow), and Echo (red). The toy debuted in 2007 at RadioShack stores. A similar redesign would be introduced later, fittingly called the "Beetle".

Crab
The Crab was the second HEXBUG mechanical bug. It only moved sideways and reacted to obstacles, light, and sound by reversing direction. It was withdrawn in September 2014, most likely due to a common defect with its back legs. The Crab came in five separate colors: Green, Red, Black, Indigo, and Turquoise. This model debuted in Fall 2008.

Inchworm
The Inchworm was the first IR controlled mechanical bug, which utilized a remote that allowed free motion about its center and inched around with two sets of legs, hence the "inchworm". The Inchworm came in five colors: Green, Red, Indigo, Black, and Plum. The Inchworm also debuted in Fall 2008 along with the Crab. Despite being called an Inchworm, this product only resembles the Inchworm in the fact that it inches around; visually, there is no resemblance.

Ant 
The Ant is a 6-cm (2.3-inches) long micro robotic insect that has front and rear touch sensors that allow it to maneuver around objects in its path, while its wheel-legs enable the robotic ant to move around ten times faster than any previous HEXBUG robot. It was released in April 2009hexbug_ant.jpg

Beetle (hi-tech Beetle)
The hi-tech HEXBUG Beetle, a micro robotic creature, will travel in a straight line until it hits an object in its path or hears a loud noise. Upon contact or noise, the bug reverses in a half circle, then moves forward in a new direction. Featuring bump sensor feelers, it crawls and senses objects. It is available in multiple colors and comes with two batteries. It is suitable for children eight years of age and older.

Spider
The Spider is a remote-controlled hexapod robot able to change direction by its head rotation. The head presses the leg joints into moving forward in the direction where the head is pointed. It is powered by three replaceable LR44 (AG13) Button cell batteries.

Battle Spider 1.0
The Battle Spider is a variant of the Spider. Equipped with an LED light and sensor, it can engage in laser-tag battle. Unlike the standard Spider and the Battle Spider 2.0, the first edition of the Battle Spider can only move forward. It is powered by three replaceable LR44 (AG13) batteries.

Battle Spider 2.0
The Battle Spider 2.0 is a revised edition of the Battle Spider. It can walk backwards like the original Spider and is powered by three replaceable LR44 (AG13) batteries.

Scarab
The Scarab is a fast-moving mechanical robot made to resemble a beetle with six legs.  Its movement is autonomous and random, reacting to obstacles with a rapid change in direction. The Scarab automatically will return to its feet if it is upside-down. Internal gears and motors are visible through its translucent shell. It is powered by three replaceable LR44 (AG13) batteries.

Tarantula
The Tarantula is an eight-legged remote-controlled robot resembling the Strandbeast. It can move in all directions as well as rotate.

Battle Tarantula
The Battle Tarantula features the same functions as the Tarantula but can shoot as well as move.

Nano Nitro 

A development of the Nano v2 (2013) released in 2017. These bugs, like their v2 and original counterparts, are also bristlebots. An improvement is that they have five spines on their back rather than the v2's three spines. Another improvement is reduced oscillation. With less oscillation these bugs can move faster. Their spines enable them to climb vertically between two suitably-spaced plates or tube walls. The five spines on their backs enhance their stability compared to the v2, particularly when self-righting from their backs.

A variety of clear plastic tube habitats are offered with the toys, ranging from a simple vertical tube for climbing, through to multi-bot habitats in clear plastic, with horizontal arenas linked by curved climbing tubes. Additional construction set tube parts are also available, including twisted tubes, funnels and black holes.

Aquabot
A line of miniature robotic fish released in 2013. Their built-in sensors detect liquid, which activates the caudal fin for propulsion through the water. Available as a fish, jellyfish, wahoo, and seahorse.

VEX Robotics
A line of construction sets for building robots, VEX Robotics kits allow a player to build their own contraptions as well as up-scaled versions of Hexbug products. It is named after the VEX Robotics learning platform developed by Innovation First, which was prominently utilized for STEM education.

Robotic Soccer 
These car-like robots play soccer.

Discontinued versions

Larva
The Larva was a worm-like robot with an infrared eye which avoided objects in its path. Its battery use, however, was very strong. It was withdrawn in February 2015.

See also
 Hexapod (robotics)

References

External links
Official site

American inventions
Entertainment robots
Toy robots
Hexapod robots
Robotic animals